The 1983 CECAFA Cup was the 11th edition of the tournament. It was held in Kenya, and was won by the hosts Kenya. The matches were played between November 12–26.

Group A

Group B

Semi-finals

Third place match

Final

References
Rsssf archives

CECAFA Cup
International association football competitions hosted by Kenya
CECAFA